William Britain may refer to:

 William Britain, Jr., founder of the British toy company, W. Britain
Bill Brittain (1930–2011), American author
William Britten (1848–1916), British artist

See also
William Britton (disambiguation)
William Breton (disambiguation)